Dominik Köpfer and Denis Kudla were the defending champions but only Köpfer chose to defend his title, partnering Andrew Harris. Köpfer lost in the first round to Martin Joyce and J. J. Wolf.

Tommy Paul and Peter Polansky won the title after defeating Gonzalo Escobar and Roberto Quiroz 6–3, 6–3 in the final.

Seeds

Draw

References
 Main Draw

Columbus Challenger - Doubles
Columbus Challenger